Shahrzad is an Iranian romantic and historical drama series written by Hassan Fathi and Naghmeh Samini, produced by Mohammad Emami and directed by Hassan Fathi The storyline is set around and after the 1953 Iranian coup d'état. The series is licensed by the Ministry of Culture and Islamic Guidance of Iran and available online and in CDs around the country.
Due to its international popularity, it has been dubbed and aired in Urdu, Arabic, French, Spanish and Russian. It stars Ali Nassirian, Taraneh Alidoosti, Shahab Hosseini, Mostafa Zamani and Parinaz Izadyar.

In the first few episodes, the singer of the series was Alireza Ghorbani. Then Mohsen Chavoshi and Sina Sarlak replaced him. In the last two episodes, Amin Bani and Farnaz Maleki were added to the series' singers.

Storyline
Iranian businessman Bozorg Agha is the head of a very powerful mafia syndicate who had a strong role in the coup d'état against Dr. Mohammad Mossadegh's government on 18 August 1953. The son and daughter of two of Bozorg Agha's henchmen, Shahrzad and Farhad, are about to get married. During the coup chaos, Farhad gets arrested and sentenced to death. Bozorg Agha uses the influence he has amongst the coup heads to set Farhad free on the condition that Shahrzad agrees to break her engagement to him and marry the nephew of Bozorg Agha, Ghobad. Ghobad is already married to the sterile daughter of Bozorg Agha, Shirin, who does not take kindly to her husband's growing love for his second wife. The conflict created by these circumstances as well as the political activities of Farhad set the background for the story. The series follows the troubled lives of the people under the control of Bozorg Agha's rule as well as the ongoing rivalry between Bozorg Agha and other corrupt political leaders of the time.

Cast
  = Main cast (credited) 
  = Recurring cast (3+)
  = Guest cast (1-2)

Production
The cast of the 59-episode series includes over 200 artists. Considering the professional team behind the camera plus two years spent on pre-production and four months of shooting, it is the biggest project by the private sector for the home video network.

Location

The series was shot in Ghazali Cinematic Town in the western part of Tehran. Covering an area of 10 hectares, the complex was established in 1971 by the late director Ali Hatami, partially simulating old Tehran. It comprises various state and historic buildings; streets, and places similar to more than 100 years ago decorated by Italian decorators, particularly Gianni Cortina.
Other locations are the Museum of the Qasr Prison, Vossug ed Dowleh House, House dr Mohammad Moin, Naderi Café, Passenger Terminal, Sulaimaniyah Palace and Baharestan Square camerawork. Another location that resonated with the Armenian community in Iran is the Armenian Club that is used for weddings and outings by the Armenians. This club is used in the very first few parts of episode one of Shahrzad as a meeting place for Farhad and Shahrzad.

Distribution
Its first season was broadcast in 2014. The broadcast of the second season started on Monday, June 19, 2017 and ended on October 17, 2017. The broadcast of the third season also began from January 31, 2018 and ended on June 21, 2018. The series was broadcast weekly on Mondays.

Reception

Reviews
Parviz Jahed review from Guardian wrote:
Good story-telling has made it an intriguing and successful melodrama set against the backdrop of an important episode in Iran’s modern history.

Mehdi Ganjavi review from Global Voices Online wrote:
As the story of Shahrzad shows, the political and economic aspirations, desires, and interests of any historical moment entail a revision of what happened in the past. Shahrzad is a love story in the disturbed atmosphere.

Awards
This series has had a total of 12 nominations and 7 wins from Hafez Awards and has had 6 nominations and 2 wins from the Yas International Film Festival.

Season 1

 Also won the Best Director and Best Screenplay category at the fourth Yas International Film Festival.
Season 2 & 3

Was appreciated the most with three awards from Hafez Awards:
 The best drama actor award went to Mehdi Soltani
 The best drama actress to Roya Nonahali
 Best director award to Hassan Fathi.
And eight nominations, including:
 Best Actress for Taraneh Alidosti, Prinaz Izdiar and Galareh Abbasi
 Best Actor for Mostafa Zamani, Shahab Hosseini and Amir Hossein Fathi

Poll 
 Best Series in Iran of all Time with 67% vote - Cmmagazine

Celebration and Appreciation 

Celebration and appreciation ceremony of the actors of Shahrzad series was held last night, Sunday, May 16, in the presence of the agents of this series and other cinema artists in the conference hall of Milad Tower in Tehran.

Soundtracks

Shahrzad OST

References

External links

 
 www.shahrzadseries.com (Pr)
 www.shahrzadseries.com (En)
 

2010s Iranian television series
Iranian television series
Television series set in 1953